The Keeper is a 2011 Fiction short story by Christian author Ted Dekker and Tosca Lee. It is a prequel story to the first book in The Book of Mortals Series, Forbidden. It was not put into print, but was released as an eBook. First there was the Circle Trilogy. Now a new stunning epic begins.

Plot summary
While in the Russian wasteland, Talus has a secret that is so terrible that it will cost him his life if he shares it. The secret is so terrible that he must share it with those who will help him protect the knowledge that will one day save all of humanity. His two brothers, who are both hermit monks, are the ones he has decided to share his secret with. Time is short, and no man could fully prepare themselves with the revelation that this secret holds, a secret Talus’ two brothers will discover: that they are already dead.

References

American Christian novels
Novels by Ted Dekker
2011 short stories